Sven Meyer may refer to:

 Sven Meyer (footballer)
 Sven Meyer (figure skater)